Ayla Marie Kell (born October 7, 1990) is an American actress. She is best known for the role of Payson Keeler in the ABC Family series Make It or Break It.

Career
Kell began studying ballet at a young age and danced with the American Ballet Theatre at the Kodak Theatre in Hollywood, California as Greta in The Nutcracker. She completed 15 years of Royal Academy of Dance ballet training at the Los Angeles Ballet Academy and competed in the finals at the Youth America Grand Prix in New York City. She was a featured dancer at Valentio's International Carousel in Tokyo, Japan. Kell has appeared in many international commercials for Disney, Sony, Mattel, and Pringles.

Personal life
In November 2014, Kell began dating actor Sterling Knight, whom she had met on the set of Melissa & Joey.  The couple announced their engagement in October 2018.

Filmography

References

External links
 
 

1990 births
Actresses from Los Angeles
American ballerinas
American child actresses
American film actresses
American television actresses
American people of Italian descent
Living people
20th-century American actresses
21st-century American actresses